The Chaldean Catholic Church (ʿīdtha kaldetha qāthuliqetha;  al-Kanīsa al-kaldāniyya) is an Eastern Catholic particular church (sui juris) in full communion with the Holy See and the rest of the Catholic Church, and is headed by the Chaldean Patriarchate. Employing in its liturgy the East Syriac Rite in the Syriac dialect of the Aramaic language, it is part of Syriac Christianity. Headquartered in the Cathedral of Our Lady of Sorrows, Baghdad, Iraq, since 1950, it is headed by the Catholicos-Patriarch Louis Raphaël I Sako. In 2010, it had a membership of 490,371, of whom 310,235 (63.27%) lived in the Middle East (mainly in Iraq).

The United States Commission on International Religious Freedom reports that, according to the Iraqi Christian Foundation, an agency of the Chaldean Catholic Church, approximately 80% of Iraqi Christians are of that church. In its own 2018 Report on Religious Freedom, the United States Department of State put the Chaldean Catholics at approximately 67% of the Christians in Iraq. The 2019 Country Guidance on Iraq of the European Union Agency for Asylum gives the same information as the United States Department of State.

Origin 

The Chaldean Catholic Church arose following a schism within the Church of the East. In 1552, the established "Eliya line" of patriarchs was opposed by a rival patriarch, Sulaqa, who initiated what is called the "Shimun line". He, and his early successors, entered into communion with the Catholic Church, but in the course of over a century loosened their link with Rome and under Shimun XIII Dinkha, openly renounced it in 1672, by adopting a profession of faith that contradicted that of Rome, while they maintained their independence from the "Eliya line". Leadership of those who wished to be in communion with Rome then passed to the Archbishop of Amid Joseph I, recognized as Catholic patriarch, first by the Turkish civil authorities (1677), and then by Rome itself (1681). 

A century and a half later, in 1830, Rome conferred headship of the Catholics on Yohannan Hormizd. A member of the "Eliya line" family: he opposed Eliya XII (1778–1804), the last of that line to be elected in the normal way as patriarch, was himself irregularly elected in 1780, as Sulaqa had been in 1552, and won over to communion with Rome most of the followers of the Eliya line. The "Shimun line" that in 1553 entered communion with Rome and broke it off in 1672, is now that of the church that in 1976 officially adopted the name "Assyrian Church of the East", while a member of the "Eliya line" family is part of the series of patriarchs of the Chaldean Catholic Church.

The description "Chaldean"
For many centuries, from at least the time of Jerome (c. 347 – 420), the term "Chaldean" was a misnomer that indicated the Biblical Aramaic language and was still the normal name in the nineteenth century. Only in 1445 did it begin to be used to mean Aramaic speakers in communion with the Catholic Church, on the basis of a decree of the Council of Florence, which accepted the profession of faith that Timothy, metropolitan of the Aramaic speakers in Cyprus, made in Aramaic, and which decreed that "nobody shall in future dare to call [...] Chaldeans, Nestorians". 

Previously, when there were as yet no Catholic Aramaic speakers of Mesopotamian origin, the term "Chaldean" was applied with explicit reference to their "Nestorian" religion. Thus Jacques de Vitry wrote of them in 1220/1 that "they denied that Mary was the Mother of God and claimed that Christ existed in two persons. They consecrated leavened bread and used the 'Chaldean' (Syriac) language". The decree of the Council of Florence was directed against use of "Chaldean" to signify "non-Catholic."

Outside of Catholic Church usage, the term "Chaldean" continued to apply to all associated with the Church of the East tradition, whether they were in communion with Rome or not.  It indicated not race or nationality, but only language or religion. Throughout the 19th century, it continued to be used of East Syriac Christians, whether "Nestorian" or Catholic, and this usage continued into the 20th century. In 1852 George Percy Badger distinguished those whom he called Chaldeans from those whom he called Nestorians, but by religion alone, never by language, race or nationality.

Patriarch Raphael I Bidawid of the Chaldean Catholic Church (1989–2003), who accepted the term Assyrian as descriptive of his nationality and ethnicity, commented: "When a portion of the Church of the East became Catholic in the 17th Century, the name given to the church was 'Chaldean' based on the Magi kings who were believed by some to have come from what once had been the land of the Chaldean, to Bethlehem. The name 'Chaldean' does not represent an ethnicity, just a church [...] We have to separate what is ethnicity and what is religion [...] I myself, my sect is Chaldean, but ethnically, I am Assyrian." Earlier, he said: "Before I became a priest I was an Assyrian, before I became a bishop I was an Assyrian, I am an Assyrian today, tomorrow, forever, and I am proud of it."

History

The Church of the East 

The Chaldean Catholic Church traces its beginnings to the Church of the East, which was founded in the Parthian Empire. The Acts of the Apostles mentions Parthians as among those to whom the apostles preached on the day of Pentecost (Acts 2:9). Thomas the Apostle, Thaddeus of Edessa, and Bartholomew the Apostle are reputed to be its founders. One of the modern Churches that boast descent from it says it is "the Church in Babylon" spoken of in 1 Peter 5:13 and that he visited it.

Under the rule of the Sasanian Empire, which overthrew the Parthians in 224, the Church of the East continued to develop its distinctive identity by use of the Syriac language and Syriac script. One "Persian" bishop was at the First Council of Nicaea (325). There is no mention of Persian participation in the First Council of Constantinople (381), in which also the Western part of the Roman Empire was not involved.

The Council of Seleucia-Ctesiphon of 410, held in the Sasanian capital, recognized the city's bishop Isaac as Catholicos, with authority throughout the Church of the East. The persistent military conflicts between the Sasanians and the by then Christianized Roman Empire made the Persians suspect the Church of the East of sympathizing with the enemy. This in turn induced the Church of the East to distance itself increasingly from that in the Roman Empire. Although in a time of peace their 420 council explicitly accepted the decrees of some "western" councils, including that of Nicaea, in 424 they determined that thenceforth they would refer disciplinary or theological problems to no external power, especially not to any "western" bishop or council.

The theological controversy that followed the Council of Ephesus in 431 was a turning point in the history of the Church of the East. The Council condemned as heretical the Christology of Nestorius, whose reluctance to accord the Virgin Mary the title Theotokos "God-bearer, Mother of God" was taken as evidence that he believed two separate persons (as opposed to two united natures) to be present within Christ. The Sasanian Emperor provided refuge for those who in the Nestorian schism rejected the decrees of the Council of Ephesus enforced in the Byzantine Empire. In 484 he executed the pro-Roman Catholicos Babowai. Under the influence of Barsauma, Bishop of Nisibis, the Church of the East officially accepted as normative the teaching not of Nestorius himself, but of his teacher Theodore of Mopsuestia, whose writings the 553 Second Council of Constantinople condemned as Nestorian but some modern scholars view them as orthodox. The position thus assigned to Theodore in the Church of the East was reinforced in several subsequent synods in spite of the opposing teaching of Henana of Adiabeme.

After its split with the West and its adoption of a theology that some called Nestorianism, the Church of the East expanded rapidly in the medieval period due to missionary work. Between 500 and 1400, its geographical horizon extended well beyond its heartland in present-day northern Iraq, northeastern Syria, and southeastern Turkey, setting up communities throughout Central Asia and as far as China (as witnessed by the Xi'an Stele), a Tang dynasty tablet in Chinese script dating to 781 that documented 150 years of Christian history in China. Their most lasting addition was of the Saint Thomas Christians of the Malabar Coast in India, where they had around 10 million followers.
 
However, a decline had already set in at the time of Yahballaha III (1281–1317), when the Church of the East reached its greatest geographical extent, it had in south and central Iraq and in south, central and east Persia only four dioceses, where at the end of the ninth century it had at least 54, and Yahballaha himself died at the hands of a Muslim mob.

Around 1400, the Turco-Mongol nomadic conqueror Timur arose out of the Eurasian Steppe to lead military campaigns all across Western, Southern and Central Asia, ultimately seizing much of the Muslim world after defeating the Mamluks of Egypt and Syria, the emerging Ottoman Empire, and the declining Delhi Sultanate. Timur's conquests devastated most Assyrian bishoprics and destroyed the 4000-year-old cultural and religious capital of Assur. After the destruction brought on by Timur, the massive and organized Church of the East structure was largely reduced to its region of origin, with the exception of the Saint Thomas Christians in India.

1552 schism 

The Church of the East has seen many disputes about the position of Catholicos. A synod in 539 decided that neither of the two claimants, Elisha and Narsai, who had been elected by rival groups of bishops in 524, was legitimate. Similar conflicts occurred between Barsauma and Acacius of Seleucia-Ctesiphon and between Hnanisho I and Yohannan the Leper. The 1552 conflict was not merely between two individuals but extended to two rival lines of patriarchs, like the 1964 schism between what are now called the Assyrian and the Ancient Church of the East.

Dissent over the practice of hereditary succession to the Patriarchate, usually from uncle to nephew, led to the action in 1552 by a group of bishops from the northern regions of Amid and Salmas who elected as a rival Patriarch the abbot of Rabban Hormizd Monastery (which was the Patriarch's residence) Yohannan Sulaqa. "To strengthen the position of their candidate the bishops sent him to Rome to negotiate a new union". By tradition, a patriarch could be ordained only by someone of archiepiscopal (metropolitan) rank, a rank to which only members of that one family were promoted. So Sulaqa travelled to Rome, where, presented as the new patriarch elect, he entered communion with the Catholic Church and was ordained by the Pope and recognized as patriarch. 

The title or description under which he was recognized as patriarch is given variously as "Patriarch of Mosul in Eastern Syria"; "Patriarch of the Church of the Chaldeans of Mosul"; "Patriarch of the Chaldeans"; "Patriarch of Mosul"; or "Patriarch of the Eastern Assyrians", this last being the version given by Pietro Strozzi on the second-last unnumbered page before page 1 of his De Dogmatibus Chaldaeorum, of which an English translation is given in Adrian Fortescue's Lesser Eastern Churches. The "Eastern Assyrians", who, if not Catholic, were presumed to be Nestorians, were distinguished from the "Western Assyrians" (those west of the Tigris River), who were looked on as Jacobites. It was as Patriarch of the "Eastern Assyrians" that Sulaqa's successor, Abdisho IV Maron, was accredited for participation in the Council of Trent.
 
The names already in use (except that of "Nestorian") were thus applied to the existing church (not a new one) for which the request to consecrate its patriarch was made by emissaries who gave the impression that the patriarchal see was vacant.

Shimun VIII Yohannan Sulaqa returned home in the same year and, unable to take possession of the traditional patriarchal seat near Alqosh, resided in Amid. Before being put to death at the instigation of the partisans of the Patriarch from whom he had broken away, he ordained two metropolitans and three other bishops, thus initiating a new ecclesiastical hierarchy under what is known as the "Shimun line" of patriarchs, who soon moved from Amid eastward, settling, after many intervening places, in the isolated village of Qudshanis under Persian rule.

Successive leaders of those in communion with Rome 

Sulaqa's earliest successors entered into communion with the Catholic Church, but in the course of over a century, their link with Rome grew weak. The last to request and obtain formal papal recognition died in 1600. They adopted hereditary succession to the patriarchate, opposition to which had caused the 1552 schism. In 1672, Shimun XIII Dinkha formally broke communion with Rome, adopting a profession of faith that contradicted that of Rome, while he maintained his independence from the Alqosh-based "Eliya line" of patriarchs. The "Shimun line" eventually became the patriarchal line of what since 1976 is officially called the Assyrian Church of the East.

Leadership of those who wished to be in communion with Rome then passed to Archbishop Joseph of Amid. In 1677 his leadership was recognized first by the Turkish civil authorities, and then in 1681 by Rome.  (Until then, the authority of the Alqosh patriarch over Amid, which had been Sulaqa's residence but which his successors abandoned on having to move eastward into Safavid Iran, had been accepted by the Turkish authorities.)

All the (non-hereditary) successors in Amid of Joseph I, who in 1696 resigned for health reasons and lived on in Rome until 1707, took the name Joseph: Joseph II (1696–1713), Joseph III (1713–1757), Joseph IV (1757–1781). For that reason, they are known as the "Josephite line". Joseph IV presented his resignation in 1780 and it was accepted in 1781, after which he handed over the administration of the patriarchate to his nephew, not yet a bishop, and retired to Rome, where he lived until 1791.

Appointment of the nephew as patriarch would look like acceptance of the principle of hereditary succession. Besides, the Alqosh "Eliya line" was drawing closer to Rome, and the pro-Catholic faction within its followers was becoming predominant. For various reasons, including the ecclesiastical as well as political turbulence in Europe after the French Revolution, Rome was long unable to choose between two rival claimants to headship of the Chaldean Catholics.

The 1672 adoption by the "Shimun line" of patriarchs of Nestorian doctrine had been followed in some areas by widespread adoption of the opposing Christology upheld in Rome. This occurred not only in the Amid-Mardin area for which by Turkish decree Joseph I was patriarch, but also in the city of Mosul, where by 1700 nearly all the East Syrians were Catholics. The Rabban Hormizd Monastery, which was the seat of the "Eliya line" of patriarchs is 2 km from the village of Alqosh and about 45 km north of the city of Mosul.

In view of this situation, Patriarch Eliya XI wrote to the Pope in 1735, 1749 and 1756, asking for union. Then, in 1771, both he and his designated successor Ishoyabb made a profession of faith that Rome accepted, thus establishing communion in principle. When Eliya XI died in 1778, the metropolitans recognized as his successor Ishoyabb, who accordingly took the Eliya name (Eliya XII). To win support, Eliya made profession of the Catholic faith, but almost immediately renounced it and declared his support of the traditionalist (Nestorian) view.

Yohannan Hormizd, a member of the "Eliya line" family, opposed Eliya XII (1778–1804), the last of that line to be elected in the normal way as patriarch. In 1780 Yohannan was irregularly elected patriarch, as Sulaqa had been in 1552. He won over to communion with Rome most followers of the "Eliyya line". The Holy See did not recognize him as patriarch, but in 1791 appointed him archbishop of Amid and administrator of the Catholic patriarchate. The violent protests of Joseph IV's nephew, who was then in Rome, and suspicions raised by others about the sincerity of Yohannan's conversion prevented this being put into effect.

In 1793 it was agreed that Yohannan should withdraw from Amid to Mosul, the metropolitan see that he already held, but that the post of patriarch would not be conferred on his rival, Joseph IV's nephew. In 1802 the latter was appointed metropolitan of Amid and administrator of the patriarchate, but not patriarch. Nonetheless, he became commonly known as Joseph V. He died in 1828. Yohannan's rival for the Alqosh title of patriarch had died in 1804, with his followers so reduced in number that they did not elect any successor for him, thus bringing the Alqosh or Eliya line to an end.

Finally then, in 1830, a century and a half after the Holy See had conferred headship of the Chaldean Catholics on Joseph I of Amid, it granted recognition as Patriarch to Yohannan, whose (non-hereditary) patriarchal succession has since then lasted unbroken in the Chaldean Catholic Church.

Later history of the Chaldean Church 

In 1838, the Kurds of Soran attacked the Rabban Hormizd Monastery and Alqosh, apparently thinking the villagers were Yazidis responsible for the murder of a Kurdish chieftain, and killed over 300 Chaldean Catholics, including Gabriel Dambo, the refounder of the monastery, and other monks.

In 1846, the Ottoman Empire, which had previously classified as Nestorians those who called themselves Chaldeans, granted them recognition as a distinct millet.

The most famous patriarch of the Chaldean Church in the 19th century was Joseph VI Audo who is remembered also for his clashes with Pope Pius IX mainly about his attempts to extend the Chaldean jurisdiction over the Malabar Catholics. This was a period of expansion for the Chaldean Catholic Church.

The activity of the Turkish army and their Kurdish and Arab allies, partly in response to armed support for Russia in the territory of the Qochanis patriarchate, brought ruin also to the Chaldean dioceses of Amid, Siirt and Gazarta and the metropolitans Addai Scher of Siirt and Philippe-Jacques Abraham of Gazarta were killed in 1915).

In the 21st century, Father Ragheed Aziz Ganni, the pastor of the Chaldean Church of the Holy Spirit in Mosul, who graduated from the Pontifical University of Saint Thomas Aquinas, Angelicum in Rome in 2003 with a licentiate in ecumenical theology, was killed on 3 June 2007 in Mosul alongside the subdeacons Basman Yousef Daud, Wahid Hanna Isho, and Gassan Isam Bidawed, after he celebrated mass. Ganni has since been declared a Servant of God.

Chaldean Archbishop Paulos Faraj Rahho and three companions were abducted on 29 February 2008, in Mosul, and murdered a few days later.

21st century: international diaspora 

There are many Chaldeans in diaspora in the Western world, primarily in the American states of Michigan, Illinois and California.

In 2006, the Eparchy of Oceania, with the title of 'St Thomas the Apostle of Sydney of the Chaldeans' was set up with jurisdiction including the Chaldean Catholic communities of Australia and New Zealand. Its first Bishop, named by Pope Benedict XVI on 21 October 2006, was Archbishop Djibrail (Jibrail) Kassab, until this date, Archbishop of Bassorah in Iraq.

There has been a large immigration to the United States particularly to West Bloomfield and Oakland County in Southeast Michigan. Although the largest population resides in Southeast Michigan, there are populations in parts of California and Arizona as well, which all fall under the Eparchy of Saint Thomas the Apostle of Detroit. In addition, Canada in recent years has shown growing communities in provinces such as Ontario.

In 2008, Bawai Soro of the Assyrian Church of the East and 1,000 Assyrian families were received into full communion with the Chaldean Catholic Church.

On Friday, June 10, 2011, Pope Benedict XVI erected a new Chaldean Catholic eparchy in Toronto, Ontario, Canada and named Archbishop Yohannan Zora, who has worked alongside four priests with Catholics in Toronto (the largest community of Chaldeans) for nearly 20 years and who was previously an ad hominem Archbishop (he will retain this rank as head of the eparchy) and the Archbishop of the Archdiocese (Archeparchy) of Ahvaz (since 1974). The new eparchy, or diocese, will be known as the Chaldean Catholic Eparchy of Mar Addai. There are 38,000 Chaldean Catholics in Canada. Archbishop Zora was born in Batnaya, Iraq, on March 15, 1939. He was ordained in 1962 and worked in Iraqi parishes before being transferred to Iran in 1969.

The 2006 Australian census counted a total of 4,498 Chaldean Catholics in that country.

Historic membership censuses 
Despite the internal discords of the reigns of Yohannan Hormizd (1830–1838), Nicholas I Zaya (1839–1847) and Joseph VI Audo (1847–1878), the 19th century was a period of considerable growth for the Chaldean church, in which its territorial jurisdiction was extended, its hierarchy strengthened and its membership nearly doubled.  In 1850, the Anglican missionary George Percy Badger recorded the population of the Chaldean Catholic Church as 2,743 Chaldean families, or just under 20,000 persons.

Badger's figures cannot be squared with the figure of just over 4,000 Chaldean families recorded by Fulgence de Sainte Marie in 1796 nor with slightly later figures provided by Paulin Martin in 1867.  Badger is known to have classified as Nestorian a considerable number of villages in the Aqra district which were Chaldean at this period, and he also failed to include several important Chaldean villages in other dioceses.  His estimate is almost certainly far too low.

Paulin Martin's statistical survey in 1867, after the creation of the dioceses of Aqra, Zakho, Basra and Sehna by Joseph Audo, recorded a total church membership of 70,268, more than three times higher than Badger's estimate.  Most of the population figures in these statistics have been rounded up to the nearest thousand, and they may also have been exaggerated slightly, but the membership of the Chaldean Catholic Church at this period was certainly closer to 70,000 than to Badger's 20,000.

A statistical survey of the Chaldean Catholic Church made in 1896 by J. B. Chabot included, for the first time, details of several patriarchal vicariates established in the second half of the 19th century for the small Chaldean communities in Adana, Aleppo, Beirut, Cairo, Damascus, Edessa, Kermanshah and Teheran; for the mission stations established in the 1890s in several towns and villages in the Qudshanis patriarchate; and for the newly created Chaldean diocese of Urmi.  According to Chabot, there were mission stations in the town of Serai d’Mahmideh in Taimar and in the Hakkari villages of Mar Behısho, Sat, Zarne and 'Salamakka' (Ragula d'Salabakkan).

The last survey of the Chaldean Catholic Church before the First World War was made in 1913 by the Chaldean priest Joseph Tfinkdji, after a period of steady growth since 1896.  It then consisted of the patriarchal archdiocese of Mosul and Baghdad, four other archdioceses (Amid, Kirkuk, Seert and Urmi), and eight dioceses (Aqra, Amadiya, Gazarta, Mardin, Salmas, Sehna, Zakho and the newly created diocese of Van).  Five more patriarchal vicariates had been established since 1896 (Ahwaz, Constantinople, Basra, Ashshar and Deir al-Zor), giving a total of twelve vicariates.

Tfinkdji's grand total of 101,610 Catholics in 199 villages is slightly exaggerated, as his figures included 2,310 nominal Catholics in twenty-one 'newly converted' or 'semi-Nestorian' villages in the dioceses of Amid, Seert and Aqra, but it is clear that the Chaldean Catholic Church had grown significantly since 1896.  With around 100,000 believers in 1913, the membership of the Chaldean church was only slightly smaller than that of the Qudshanis patriarchate (probably 120,000 East Syriac Christians at most, including the population of the nominally Russian Orthodox villages in the Urmi district).  Its congregations were concentrated in far fewer villages than those of the Qudshanis patriarchate, and with 296 priests, a ratio of roughly three priests for every thousand believers, it was rather more effectively served by its clergy.  Only about a dozen Chaldean villages, mainly in the Seert and Aqra districts, did not have their own priests in 1913.

Tfinkdji's statistics also highlight the effect on the Chaldean Catholic Church of the educational reforms of the patriarch Joseph VI Audo. The Chaldean Catholic Church on the eve of the First World War was becoming less dependent on the monastery of Rabban Hormizd and the College of the Propaganda for the education of its bishops.  Seventeen Chaldean bishops were consecrated between 1879 and 1913, of whom only one (Stephen Yohannan Qaynaya) was entirely educated in the monastery of Rabban Hormizd.  Six bishops were educated at the College of the Propaganda (Joseph Gabriel Adamo, Toma Audo, Jeremy Timothy Maqdasi, Isaac Khudabakhash, Theodore Msayeh and Peter Aziz).

The future patriarch Yousef VI Emmanuel II Thomas was trained in the seminary of Ghazir near Beirut.  Of the other nine bishops, two (Addai Sher and Francis David) were trained in the Syro-Chaldean seminary in Mosul, and seven (Philip Yaqob Abraham, Yaqob Yohannan Sahhar, Eliya Joseph Khayyat, Shlemun Sabbagh, Yaqob Awgin Manna, Hormizd Stephen Jibri and ) in the patriarchal seminary in Mosul.

Organization
The Chaldean Catholic Church has the following dioceses:
 Patriarchate of Baghdad
 Metropolitan Archdioceses of Baghdad, Kirkuk, Tehran, Urmya
 Archdioceses of Ahwaz, Basra, Diyarbakir, Erbil, Mosul
 Eparchies of Aleppo, Alquoch, Amadiya, Akre, Beirut, Cairo, San Diego, Detroit, Toronto, Sydney, Salmas, Sulaimaniya, Zaku
 Territories dependent on the Patriarch: Jerusalem, Jordan

The Latin name of the church is Ecclesia Chaldaeorum Catholica.

Hierarchy
The current Patriarch is Louis Raphaël I Sako, elected in January 2013. In October 2007, his predecessor, Emmanuel III Delly became the first Chaldean Catholic patriarch to be elevated to the rank of Cardinal within the Catholic Church.

The present Chaldean episcopate (January 2014) is as follows:

Louis Raphaël I Sako, Patriarch of Baghdad (since February 2013)
Emil Shimoun Nona, Bishop of St. Thomas the Apostle Chaldean and Assyrian Catholic Diocese of Australia and New Zealand (since 2015)
Bashar Warda, Archbishop of Erbil (since July 2010)
Ramzi Garmo, Archbishop of Tehran (since 1999) and Archbishop of Amid (Diyarbakir) (since 2020) 
Thomas Meram, Archbishop of Urmia and Salmas (since 1984)
Jibrail Kassab, Bishop Emeritus, former Bishop of Sydney (2006–2015)
Jacques Ishaq, Titular Archbishop of Nisibis and curial Bishop of Babylon (since December 2005)
Habib Al-Naufali, Archbishop of Basra (since 2014)
Yousif Mirkis, Archbishop of Kirkuk and Sulaymaniyah (since 2014)
Mikha Pola Maqdassi, Bishop of Alqosh (since December 2001)
Shlemon Warduni, curial Bishop of Babylon (since 2001)
Saad Sirop, auxiliary Bishop of Babylon (since 2014) and Apostolic Visitor of Chaldean Catholic in Europe (since 2017)
Antony Audo, Bishop of Aleppo (since January 1992)
Michael Kassarji, Bishop of Lebanon (since 2001)
Rabban Al-Qas, Bishop Emeritus, former Bishop of Amadiya (2001-2022)
Ibrahim Ibrahim, Bishop Emeritus, former Bishop of Saint Thomas the Apostle of Detroit (April 1982 – 2014)
Francis Kalabat, Bishop of Saint Thomas the Apostle of Detroit (since June 2014)
Sarhad Yawsip Jammo, Bishop Emeritus of Saint Peter the Apostle of San Diego (2002–2016)
Bawai Soro, Bishop Emeritus, former Bishop of St. Addai Chaldean Eparchy of Canada (2017-2021)
Mikhael Najib, Archbishop of Chaldean Catholic Archeparchy of Mosul (since 2018)
Saad Felix Shabi, Bishop of Zakho (since 2020)
Robert Jarjis,  Former Auxiliary Bishop of Baghdad (2018-2022) and Titular Bishop of Arsamosata (since 2019), Bishop of St. Addai Chaldean Eparchy of Canada (since 2021)
Emanuel Hana Shaleta, Bishop of St. Peter the Apostle Chaldean Catholic (San Diego, USA, since 2016)
Basel Yaldo, Curial Bishop of Babylon and Titular Bishop of BethZabda (since 2015)
Paulus Thabet Mako Auxiliary Bishop of Alqosh (since 2021)
Azad Sabri Shaba Bishop of Dohuk and Amadiya   (since 2022)

Several sees are vacant:
Archeparchy of Ahwaz,
Eparchy of 'Aqra,
Eparchy of Cairo.

Liturgy

The Chaldean Catholic Church uses the East Syriac Rite.

A slight reform of the liturgy was effective since 6 January 2007, and it aimed to unify the many different uses of each parish, to remove centuries-old additions that merely imitated the Roman Rite, and for pastoral reasons. The main elements of variations are: the Anaphora said aloud by the priest, the return to the ancient architecture of the churches, the restoration of the ancient use where the bread and wine are readied before a service begins, and the removal from the Creed of the Filioque clause.

Ecumenical relations
The Church's relations with its fellow Assyrians in the Assyrian Church of the East have improved in recent years. In 1994, Pope John Paul II and Patriarch Dinkha IV of the Assyrian Church of the East signed a Common Christological Declaration. On the 20 July 2001, the Holy See issued a document, in agreement with the Assyrian Church of the East, named Guidelines for admission to the Eucharist between the Chaldean Church and the Assyrian Church of the East, which confirmed also the validity of the Anaphora of Addai and Mari.

In 2015, while the patriarchate of the Assyrian Church of the East was vacant following the death of Dinkha IV, the Chaldean Patriarch Louis Raphaël I Sako proposed unifying the three modern patriarchates into a re-established Church of the East with a single Patriarch in full communion with the Pope. The Assyrian Church of the East respectfully declined this proposal citing "ecclesiological divergences still remaining" and proceeded with its election of a new patriarch.

See also

List of Chaldean Catholic patriarchs of Baghdad
Eastern Catholic Churches
Liturgies: East Syriac Rite, Liturgy of Addai and Mari
Film about Chaldean Catholic Christians: The Last Assyrians
Catholic University in Erbil
Assyrian people
List of ethnic Assyrians, Chaldeans, and Syriacs
Terms for Syriac Christians
Syro-Malabar Church

References

Sources

Further reading 
Yakoub, Afram (2020). The Path to Assyria: A call for national revival. Sweden: Tigris Press. ISBN 978-91-981541-6-0

Lundgren, Svante (2016). The Assyrians - From Nineveh to Södertälje. Enschede, The Netherlands: Nineveh Press. ISBN 978-9198344127

External links

Chaldean Catholic Church Mass Times
Article on the Chaldean Catholic Church by Ronald Roberson on the CNEWA web site
Chaldean Catholic Diocese of Saint Peter
East Syriac Rite (Catholic Encyclopedia)
Daughters of the Immaculate Conception, a congregation located in Michigan 
Guidelines for Chaldean Catholics receiving the Eucharist in Assyrian Churches
History of the Chaldean Church
Qambel Maran- Syriac chants from South India- a review and liturgical music tradition of Syriac Christians revisited

Homepage of Fr. Damian Hungs (in German)

 
1552 establishments in Asia
Apostolic sees
Eastern Catholicism in Iraq
Eastern Catholicism in Iran